Sinocyclocheilus yangzongensis is a species of ray-finned fish in the genus Sinocyclocheilus.

References 

yangzongensis
Fish described in 1977